Let's Make Music is a 1941 American musical film directed by Leslie Goodwins starring Bob Crosby, Jean Rogers and Elisabeth Risdon. It was produced by RKO Pictures and written by Nathanael West. The film's songs include the classic "Big Noise from Winnetka".

Plot
Newton High music teacher Malvina Adams (Risdon) is asked to retire since attendance in her classes keeps dropping each year. Trying to prove she's still got it, Adams composes a school fight song which finds its way into the hands of bandleader Bob Crosby (playing himself) who turns it into an overnight hit. Though her niece Abby (Rogers) protests, Malvina travels to New York to perform her song with Bob's band, while her niece falls for the bandleader. The newness of the song fades quickly though, and Malvina tries to write one more hit song before finally giving up and returning to Newton.

Cast

 Bob Crosby as himself 
 Jean Rogers as Abby Adams 
 Elisabeth Risdon as Malvina Adams 
 Joseph Buloff as Joe Bellah 
 Joyce Compton as Betty 
 Benny Bartlett as Tommy
 Louis Jean Heydt as Mr. Stevens 
 Bill Goodwin as himself 
 Frank Orth as Mr. Botts 
 Grant Withers as  Headwaiter
 Willa Pearl Curtis as Carolyn 
 Walter Tetley as Eddie
 Betty Rowland as Betty, Chorus Girl 
 Renee Godfrey as 	Helen, Chorus Girl 
 Jimmy Conlin as Jim, the Pianist 
 Jack Norton as 	Mr. Orton, a Drunk
 Benny Rubin as 	Music Publisher
 Gale Sherwood as High School Singer

Production notes
In April 1940 Nathanael West, then a contract writer at RKO Pictures, was asked to work on a script, tentatively named Malvina Swings It, which writer Charles Roberts failed to complete satisfactorily. After working on the screenplay for almost ten nonconsecutive weeks, West had turned it into Let's Make Music, which hoped to benefit from Bob Crosby's popularity. The rewriting was so significant West received solo screenwriting credit.

Reception
The reviewer from The New York Times commented that, "no doubt worse movies have been made," but was at a loss to name any. The Film Daily critic called it, "a picture for all situations, ages, and types, although it is conceivable that some inflexible devotees of classical music may be holdouts, and term it esthetically 'gross.' But it's plenty gross for the box offices."

References

External links

1941 films
American black-and-white films
Films directed by Leslie Goodwins
Films with screenplays by Nathanael West
1941 musical films
American musical films
RKO Pictures films
1940s English-language films
1940s American films